Rafael Rodrigues Barreto (born October 21, 1985), best known as Rafael Barreto, is a Brazilian pop singer and songwriter. He rose to fame after winning the third season of the reality television show Ídolos Brazil.

Biography

Rafael Barreto was born on October 21, 1985, in Salvador, Bahia, Brazil. He has been singing since age 13 and began composing at 16.

Barreto became motherless in 2006, his father left home and gave no further news. Then, he had a brain aneurysm at the end of 2007 and receive a full support from his brother, Edu Barreto and his girlfriend Deya.

Rafael's musical inspirations include Michael Jackson, Marvin Gaye, LS Jack, Skank, Ana Carolina, Jota Quest, Djavan and Lulu Santos.

Ídolos Brazil

Overview

Barreto auditioned for the third season of Ídolos Brazil in Salvador, Bahia.

Performances

Career

Barreto signed a recording contract with Sony Music Entertainment, managed by Rede Record in December 2008.

Pensando em Você

Studio recording sessions for the eponymous major label debut Rafael Barreto ran in São Paulo, São Paulo early 2009. Rafael Barreto: Pensando em Você was released in June 2009 in Brazil, with the song "Pensando em Você" (English: Thinking of You) as first single.

In a break with Ídolos tradition, Barreto's Ídolos "coronation song", "Não Vou Duvidar" (English: I Don't Doubt), despite being included on his major-label debut, wasn't released as a single, becoming the first Ídolos winner album to do so.

Music Video

Filming of Rafael Barreto's first music video started between May to June 2009 in São Paulo, São Paulo. The video premiered on June 26, 2009.

Discography

 Rafael Barreto: Pensando em Você (2009)

References

External links

1985 births
21st-century Brazilian male singers
21st-century Brazilian singers
Idols (TV series) winners
Living people
People from Salvador, Bahia